Hippopsicon is a genus of beetles in the family Cerambycidae, containing the following species:

 Hippopsicon albopleurum Breuning, 1949
 Hippopsicon attenuatum Breuning, 1940
 Hippopsicon bambesae Breuning, 1952
 Hippopsicon clarkei Breuning, 1976
 Hippopsicon confluens Breuning, 1942
 Hippopsicon cordicolle Breuning, 1942
 Hippopsicon cribricolle Quedenfeldt, 1888
 Hippopsicon densepunctatum Breuning, 1940
 Hippopsicon densepuncticolle Breuning, 1981
 Hippopsicon griseopictum Breuning, 1940
 Hippopsicon griseovittatum Breuning, 1964
 Hippopsicon ivorense Breuning, 1968
 Hippopsicon lacteolum Thomson, 1858
 Hippopsicon luteolum Quedenfeldt, 1882
 Hippopsicon macrophthalmum Breuning, 1978
 Hippopsicon montanum Quentin & Villiers, 1981
 Hippopsicon ochreomaculatum Breuning, 1940
 Hippopsicon pleuricum Jordan, 1903
 Hippopsicon postochreomaculatum Breuning, 1968
 Hippopsicon puncticolle Aurivillius, 1907
 Hippopsicon rotundipenne Breuning, 1940
 Hippopsicon rugicolle Breuning, 1940
 Hippopsicon rusticum Gerstäcker, 1871
 Hippopsicon simile Breuning, 1956
 Hippopsicon victoriae Breuning, 1952

References

Agapanthiini